{{Infobox company 
|name = Northern Engineering Industries plc 
|logo =Northern Engineering Industries logo.png
|logo_size = 150px
|fate =Acquired
|successor= Rolls-Royce plc
|type = Public 
|foundation = 1977 
|defunct=1989
|location =  Newcastle, England, UK
|key_people = Terry Harrison, (Chairman)Dr Robert Hawley, (Managing Director)
|industry = Engineering, Power Generation, Power Transmission, Power Distribution & Material Handling
|products = Industrial Engineering
|revenue = 
|operating_income = 
|net_income = 
|num_employees = 40,000 (1991)
|parent =
|subsid =
|homepage = 
|footnotes =
}}Northern Engineering Industries plc''' (NEI) was a British engineering firm, which for over 10 years was one of the largest employers on Tyneside. Its headquarters were based at the Regent Centre at Gosforth in Newcastle upon Tyne.

History
The company was established by way of a merger between Clarke Chapman and Reyrolle Parsons in 1977. It manufactured cranes (Clarke Chapman), transformers (Bruce Peebles & Co. Ltd.),  switchgear (A. Reyrolle & Company), boilers (Power Engineering Ltd), control systems (Control and Instrumentation Ltd.), and turbines (C.A. Parsons and Company).

In 1981 the company acquired Amalgamated Power Engineering (APE), a leading manufacturer of engines. APE was itself the result of a merger in 1968 of W.H. Allen (founded in 1880 and based in Bedford), Belliss and Morcom of Birmingham, and Crossley Engines (founded in 1867 and based in Manchester).

Northern Engineering Industries was led through much of its existence by Sir Duncan McDonald, first as Group Managing Director (1977 to 1980) and then as Chairman (1980 to 1986) and by Sir Terence Harrison first as Chief Executive (1983 to 1986) and then as Chairman (1986 to 1989).

The company was acquired by Rolls-Royce plc in 1989 later becoming known as the Rolls-Royce Industrial Power Group.

See also

 Clarke Chapman
 A. Reyrolle & Company
 C. A. Parsons and Company

References

Manufacturing companies established in 1977
Engineering companies of the United Kingdom
Electrical engineering companies of the United Kingdom
Former defence companies of the United Kingdom
Companies based in Newcastle upon Tyne
Companies formerly listed on the London Stock Exchange
Manufacturing companies disestablished in 1989
Rolls-Royce
Technology companies established in 1977
Technology companies disestablished in 1989
1989 mergers and acquisitions